Passos no Escuro (Portuguese for "Footsteps in the Dark") is an extended play by the Brazilian rock band Zero. It came out in 1985 by EMI.

The EP was a massive commercial success, to the point of receiving a Gold Certification by Pro-Música Brasil, and spawned the hit singles "Formosa" and "Agora Eu Sei"; the latter counted with a guest appearance by RPM vocalist Paulo Ricardo on backing vocals. Music videos would also be made for those tracks.

Track listing

Personnel
 Guilherme Isnard – vocals, alto sax (on tracks 1, 2 and 4), photography, cover art
 Eduardo Amarante – guitars
 Athos Costa – drums
 Ricardo "Rick" Villas-Boas – bass
 Alfred "Freddy" Haiat – keyboard
 Paulo Ricardo – backing vocals (on track 2)
 Maurício Valladares – production
 José Celso – mixing

References

External links
 Passos no Escuro at Discogs

1985 debut EPs
EMI Records EPs
New wave EPs
Post-punk EPs
Portuguese-language EPs
Zero (Brazilian band) albums